Tusson is a commune in the Charente department in southwestern France.

It is the site of four large Neolithic tumuli, known as the Gros Dognon, the Petit Dognon, the Vieux Breuil and La Justice. Marguerite de Navarre spent time in the priory in the village, built by Robert d'Abrissel in the 12th century as an offshoot of the Abbey of Fontevraud. The village grew up subsequently around the religious establishment.

Until the 1960s it used to be a centre for the trading of horses and donkeys. Nowadays it is known for its artists and craftspeople, as well as its well-preserved historical buildings, many renovated with the participation of the Club Marpen, a local heritage group.

Population

See also
Communes of the Charente department

References

Communes of Charente